Wheeler Milmoe (April 18, 1898 – April 8, 1972) was an American newspaper editor and politician from New York.

Life
He was born on April 18, 1898, in Canastota, Madison County, New York, the son Patrick F. Milmoe (died 1918) and Margaret M. Milmoe. He attended the public schools, and Canastota High School. He graduated A.B. from Cornell University in 1917. After the death of his father he took over he publication of The Canastota Bee–Journal. On July 6, 1927, he married Frances Veronica Tobin, and they had two children.

Milmoe was a member of the New York State Assembly (Madison Co.) in 1934, 1935, 1936, 1937, 1938, 1939–40, 1941–42, 1943–44, 1945–46, 1947–48, 1949–50 and 1951–52.

He was a member of the New York State Senate from 1953 to 1958, sitting in the 169th, 170th and 171st New York State Legislatures. He was an alternate delegate to the 1956 Republican National Convention.

He died on April 8, 1972, in Oneida City Hospital in Oneida, New York; and was buried at St. Agatha's Cemetery in Canastota.

Sources

External links
 

1898 births
1972 deaths
People from Canastota, New York
Republican Party New York (state) state senators
Republican Party members of the New York State Assembly
Cornell University alumni
20th-century American politicians